Joey Caputo (Canberra, 24 April 2000) is an Australian rugby union player.
His usual position is as a fly-half and he currently plays for Zebre Parma in Pro14, on loan with Top10 team Viadana.

Caputo signed for Zebre Parma in June 2022 ahead of the 2022–23 United Rugby Championship.

In the 2021-22 season, he played for Benetton and on loan for Top10 team Mogliano

References

External Links
It's rugby England profile

Living people
Australian rugby union players
Italian rugby union players
Benetton Rugby players
Mogliano Rugby players
Zebre Parma players
Rugby union fly-halves
2000 births
Rugby union players from Canberra
Rugby Viadana players